The Ryan House is a historic building in Sumner, Washington, United States that is now used as a museum.

The house was built by Fred Seaman as a one-room cabin. In 1872, George Ryan bought the property. He added onto the house in 1875 and 1885.

In 1926, Ryan's family donated the property to the town of Sumner for use as the Sumner Public Library. The building housed the library from 1926 to 1979, and now houses the Sumner Historical Society, which operates the house as the Ryan House Museum.

References

Sources
 Ryan, Amy M., The Sumner Story, copyright 1988, Sumner Historical Society

External links
 
 Sumner Historical Society - Ryan House Museum

National Register of Historic Places in Pierce County, Washington
Houses in Pierce County, Washington
Museums in Pierce County, Washington
Historic house museums in Washington (state)
Houses on the National Register of Historic Places in Washington (state)